Brad Cousino (born April 5, 1953) is a former American football linebacker. He played for the Cincinnati Bengals in 1975, the New York Giants in 1976 and for the Pittsburgh Steelers in 1977.

References

1953 births
Living people
American football linebackers
Miami RedHawks football players
Cincinnati Bengals players
New York Giants players
Pittsburgh Steelers players